is located in the Daisetsuzan Volcanic Group of the Ishikari Mountains, Hokkaido, Japan. It sits on the north rim of the Ohachidaira caldera.

See also
List of volcanoes in Japan
List of mountains in Japan

References
 Geographical Survey Institute

Naka